The Bangkok Challenger (formerly known as SAT Bangkok Open, Chang-Sat Bangkok Open and KPN Bangkok Open) is a tennis tournament held in Bangkok, Thailand since 2009. The event is part of the ATP Challenger Tour and is played on outdoor hard courts.

Past finals

Singles

Doubles

References

External links 

 ITF search

 
 
 
 
2009 establishments in Thailand
Tennis
Tennis
ATP Challenger Tour
Hard court tennis tournaments
January sporting events
Recurring sporting events established in 2009
Tennis
Tennis in Bangkok
Tennis tournaments in Thailand